Aigerim Alimkulova (Äigerım Älımqūlova; born 3 September 1990) is a Kazakhstani footballer who plays as a defender. She has been a member of the Kazakhstan women's national team.

She started her career as a member of the team "Sports School No.2" of Almaty. А year later she was transferred to the youth team of Astana. In 2011-2013, Alimkulova played in the SShVSM-Kairat. In 2014, Alimkulova was transferred to the ZhFC "Kokshe". Since 2016 she has been a player of Astana. In 2017, Alimkulova moved back to the ZhFK "Kokshe".

From 2009 to 2011 she played in the youth team of Kazakhstan. In general, Alimkulova played 3 matches for the youth team and did not score any goal.

On March 31, 2012, Alimkulova debuted in the main team in the match against Romania (0:3). She played 4 matches for the main team and did not score any goal.

References

1990 births
Living people
Women's association football defenders
Kazakhstani women's footballers
Kazakhstan women's international footballers
CSHVSM-Kairat players